Manuel Sánchez Delgado (born 17 January 1965), known as Manolo, is a Spanish retired footballer who played as a striker.

Over nine seasons, he amassed La Liga totals of 292 matches and 96 goals, mainly with Atlético Madrid with whom he won two major titles. He also competed at that level with Murcia.

Manolo represented Spain at the 1990 World Cup.

Club career
Born in Cáceres, Extremadura, Manolo grew up in the ranks of local CP Cacereño, making his senior debut with the club at the age of 17. After two years with CE Sabadell FC, the last in the Segunda División, he moved to Real Murcia in the same level, helping it promote to La Liga in the 1985–86 season then scoring 11 goals in 36 appearances the following campaign, with the team retaining their top-flight status.

In summer 1988, Manolo signed with Atlético Madrid, where he knew his most successful years, forming a formidable attacking partnership with Paulo Futre. With countless assists from the Portuguese, he was crowned top scorer in 1991–92 with 27 goals, adding that season's – and the previous – Copa del Rey trophies.

Manolo retired in October 1996 at the age of 31, after half a season with CP Mérida where he failed to appear in any matches due to a serious tibia injury, as he was just four goals shy of 100 in the Spanish top tier. He started coaching in 2007, first with Galáctico Pegaso, going on to spend several years in the lower leagues.

International career
Manolo made his debut for Spain immediately after having been bought by Atlético Madrid, scoring against the Republic of Ireland on 16 November 1988 for the 1990 FIFA World Cup qualification stages. He went on to total 28 caps and nine goals, representing the nation in the finals in Italy where he only appeared in the first group stage game against Uruguay (0–0).

International goals

Honours
Atlético Madrid
Copa del Rey: 1990–91, 1991–92

Murcia
Segunda División: 1985–86

Individual
Pichichi Trophy: 1991–92

References

External links

1965 births
Living people
People from Cáceres, Spain
Sportspeople from the Province of Cáceres
Spanish footballers
Footballers from Extremadura
Association football forwards
La Liga players
Segunda División players
Segunda División B players
CD Diocesano players
CP Cacereño players
CE Sabadell FC footballers
Real Murcia players
Atlético Madrid footballers
CP Mérida footballers
Spain youth international footballers
Spain under-23 international footballers
Spain international footballers
1990 FIFA World Cup players
Pichichi Trophy winners
Spanish football managers
Segunda División B managers
Tercera División managers
CF Rayo Majadahonda managers
CP Cacereño managers